Synaptomys australis, the Florida bog lemming, is an extinct species of bog lemming that occurred in Florida during the Late Pleistocene.

Taxonomy
Although the bog lemmings are not indigenous to Florida at the present time, remains are known there from the Pleistocene, indicating the range of these normally cold-adapted rodents extended further south during glaciation events. The Florida bog lemming was described from a lower jaw collected from Pleistocene deposits in 1928. Its taxonomic status as a full species has been questioned however, with some researchers considering it a prehistoric race of the southern bog lemming.

Description
The Florida bog lemming was slightly larger than the living southern bog lemming. It went extinct around 12,000 BP, as a result of glacial retreat and the return of very warm temperatures.

References

Prehistoric rodents
Pleistocene rodents
Prehistoric mammals of North America
Pleistocene mammals of North America
Synaptomys